Eresiomera nigeriana, the Nigerian pearly, is a butterfly in the family Lycaenidae. It is found in Nigeria. The habitat consists of forests.

References

Endemic fauna of Nigeria
Butterflies described in 1962
Poritiinae